St Luke's High School is a school in the Auchenback area of Barrhead, East Renfrewshire, in the Greater Glasgow area of Scotland. The school focuses on its Catholic ethos in teaching and its close relationship with the communities of Barrhead and Neilston, as well as areas further afield including Paisley, Pollok, Glenburn and Uplawmoor.

Associated primary schools 
Also known as "feeder" schools, associated primary schools include:
 St John's Primary School, Commercial Road, Barrhead
 St Mark's Primary School, Roebank Drive, Barrhead
 St Thomas' Primary School, Broadlie Road, Neilston

Notable former pupils
 
 Paul O'Kane, politician 
Kevin Guthrie, actor
 Christopher Brookmyre, author
 Barrie McKay, footballer
 Jon McShane, footballer
 Mark O'Hara, footballer

References

External links
 Official school website
St Luke's High School's profile,  Scottish Schools Online

Catholic secondary schools in East Renfrewshire
1977 establishments in Scotland
Educational institutions established in 1977